Ghidigeni is a commune in Galați County, Western Moldavia, Romania with a population of 6,244 people. It is composed of eight villages: Gara Ghidigeni, Gârbovăț, Gefu, Ghidigeni, Gura Gârbovățului, Slobozia Corni, Tălpigi and Tăplău.

References

Communes in Galați County
Localities in Western Moldavia